Thorstein the Red or Thorstein Olafsson was a viking chieftain who flourished in late ninth-century Scotland.

Biography
He was born around 850 AD and was the son of Olaf the White, King of Dublin, and Aud the Deep-minded, who was the daughter of Ketil Flatnose. After the death of Olaf, Aud and Thorstein went to live in the Hebrides, then under Ketil's rule. 
Thorstein eventually became a warlord and allied with the Jarl of Orkney, Sigurd Eysteinsson. Together Thorstein and Sigurd waged a series of campaigns in Caithness, Sutherland, Ross, Moray, and a number of other regions, eventually receiving tribute from half of Scotland. However, the Scottish chieftains plotted against Thorstein, and he was killed; the exact nature of his death is unknown but it probably took place around 880 or 890. After Thorstein's death Aud left Caithness, sojourning for a while in Orkney before settling with other members of her clan in Iceland.

Thorstein married Thurid, the daughter of Eyvind the Easterner. Thorstein and Thurid had a son, Olaf Feilan, and a number of daughters, including Groa, Thorgerd, Olof, Osk, Thorhild, and Vigdis.

Ancestry

See also
Jaun Zuria supposed founder of the Lords of Biscay and speculatively linked with Thorstein's father Olafr hinn Hviti.

Notes

References
Ari the Learned. The Book of the Settlement of Iceland (Landnámabók). Ellwood, T., transl. Kendal: T. Wilson, Printer and Publisher, 1898.
Cook, Robert, transl. Njal's Saga. Penguin Classics, 2002.
Forte, Angelo, Richard Oram and Frederik Pedersen. Viking Empires. Cambridge University Press, 2005 .
Jones, Gwyn, transl. Eirik the Red and other Icelandic Sagas. Oxford Univ. Press, USA, 1999.
Magnusson, Magnus and Hermann Palsson, transl. Laxdaela Saga. Penguin Classics, 1969.
Palsson, Hermann, et al., transl. Eyrbyggja Saga. Penguin Classics, 1989.
Palsson, Hermann, et al., transl. Orkneyinga Saga: The History of the Earls of Orkney. Penguin Classics, 1981.
Snorri Sturluson. Heimskringla, or the Chronicle of the Kings of Norway. Hard Press, 2006. 
Thorsson, Ornolfur, et al., transl. The Saga of Grettir the Strong. Penguin Classics, 2005.

External links
Stirnet: Viking03 (mentions Thorstein (as "Thorstun 'the Red'"))

Scandinavian Scotland
Norse-Gaels
Viking warriors
9th-century Scottish people
Orkneyinga saga characters
9th-century Vikings